Aivars Šnepsts (born 27 September 1957) is a Latvian bobsledder. He competed in the two man and the four man events at the 1984 Winter Olympics, representing the Soviet Union.

References

1957 births
Living people
Latvian male bobsledders
Olympic bobsledders of the Soviet Union
Bobsledders at the 1984 Winter Olympics
People from Ventspils